The Aeronautical Development Agency (ADA) under Department of Defence Research and Development (DR&D) of India's Ministry of Defence was established at Bangalore, in 1984 to oversee the development of the nation's Light Combat Aircraft (LCA) programme. It has developed HAL Tejas and is developing HAL AMCA, HAL TEDBF and DRDO Ghatak.

Facilities 
ASMS
System Design and Evaluation Facility
Computing Center
Iron Bird
LCA Hangar
Lightning Test Facility
Virtual Reality
Wind Tunnel Testing Facility

Software development 
ADA has established advanced state of the art computing centre with several powerful equipments and software.  ADA has developed specialised software in the fields of computer-aided design (CAD), computer-aided engineering (CAE), computer-aided manufacturing (CAM), avionics, systems, independent validation and verification, flight simulation. The spin-off benefits of the research and development is realised with help of commercial partnership with leading multi-national companies such as Boeing, Airbus, IBM, Dassault Systèmes, Parametric Technology Corporation (PTC). The following are some of the software developed for the LCA-Tejas development programme.

 Autolay
 CADTRANS
 FINESSE
 FINEGRAF
 GITA
 PRANA
 GNRETING

References

External links
 ADA website

1984 establishments in Karnataka
Aviation in India
Defence agencies of India
Government agencies established in 1984
Ministry of Defence (India)
Defence industry of India
Aviation organisations based in India